Belapur railway station (बेलापूर रेलवे स्टेशन) is a railway station in Ahmednagar district in the Indian state of Maharashtra on the Central Railways network.  Its code is BAP. It is one of the main stations in Ahmednagar as many passengers come here to go to shirdi,.

It is located about 37 km away from Sainagar Shirdi railway station.

This station also has a Non-AC Retiring room, and it is maintained well.

Location 
Although the station name is Belapur, it is located in the city named Shrirampur.

Trains

Towards Daund

Towards Manmad

References

Railway stations in Ahmednagar district